Tan Sri Datuk Seri Panglima Chong Kah Kiat (born 2 June 1948) is a Malaysian politician who served as Minister in the Prime Minister's Department from May 1995 to March 1999, 13th Chief Minister of Sabah from March 2001 to March 2003 and President of the Liberal Democratic Party (LDP) from 1991 to 2006.

History in politics
Born in Kudat, Chong was a graduate of New Zealand's Victoria University of Wellington, earning a Master of Laws (LL.B.) (First Class) in 1975 and subsequently practising law at the legal firm of Shelley Yap Leong Tseu Chong Chia & Co. (now known as Shelley Yap) in Kota Kinabalu.

He contested and won the Kudat seat on a BERJAYA ticket in the March 1981 state election and was appointed Assistant Minister to the Chief Minister of Sabah the following year. He held the post until April 1985 when he lost the seat to Wong Phin Chung of United Sabah Party (PBS).

In March 1987, he became a member of the Berjaya Supreme Council but later left the party when it became clear that it was losing ground.

Chong and several Chinese leaders founded the LDP in 1989 and was made its pro-tem secretary general. Then in 1991, he became the party's president. He did not contest in the 1994 state election but a year later was appointed as Senator in the Dewan Negara, and subsequently included in the Cabinet of Malaysia as a Minister in the Prime Minister's Department. He quit the federal ministerial post in March 1999 to contest in the state polls. This time, he won back his traditional stronghold of Kudat, and was appointed state minister of Tourism Development, Environment, Science and Technology.

Chong became the 13th Chief Minister of Sabah in 2001 representing the Chinese community in a rotation system mooted by former Prime Minister Dr. Mahathir Mohamad in 1994.

When Musa Aman took over the helm of the state government in 2003, Chong was appointed Deputy Chief Minister as well as the person in charge of the tourism, culture, and environment portfolio. It was then the rotation system was scrapped and from then onwards, the Chief Minister post was held by the United Malays National Organisation.

In April 2007, Chong resigned from the Deputy Chief Minister post under Musa Aman's cabinet, citing matters of principle.

Honours

Honours of Malaysia
  :
  Companion of the Order of Loyalty to the Crown of Malaysia (JSM) (1993)
  Commander of the Order of Loyalty to the Crown of Malaysia (PSM) - Tan Sri (2004)
  :
  Commander of the Order of Kinabalu (PGDK) - Datuk (1994)
  Grand Commander of the Order of Kinabalu (SPDK) – Datuk Seri Panglima (2021)

Election results

References and notes

1948 births
Living people
People from Sabah
Malaysian people of Hokkien descent
Malaysian people of Chinese descent
Malaysian Buddhists
Presidents of Liberal Democratic Party (Malaysia)
Chief Ministers of Sabah
Sabah state ministers
Government ministers of Malaysia
Members of the Dewan Negara
Members of the Sabah State Legislative Assembly
Victoria University of Wellington alumni
Companions of the Order of Loyalty to the Crown of Malaysia
Commanders of the Order of Loyalty to the Crown of Malaysia
Commanders of the Order of Kinabalu
Grand Commanders of the Order of Kinabalu